is a Japanese character designer, animator, animation director, and illustrator most notable for her works with ARMS.

Works
Midnight Panther
Dokyusei 2
Dokyusei 2 Special: Sotsugyousei
I"s
Inma Seiden
Kite
La Blue Girl
Twin Angels
Venus 5
Words Worth
Words Worth: Outer Story
Hininden Gausu
Ikki Tousen: Dragon Destiny (character design and chief animation director)
Elfen Lied: key animation(OP/ED)
High School Girls: eyecatch
To Love-Ru: key animation
Queen's Blade: Rurō no Senshi (character design and chief animation director)
Wanna Be the Strongest in the World: character design

References

External links
 

Rin-Shin
Japanese animated film directors
Japanese illustrators
Hentai manga artists
Manga artists
Living people
Year of birth missing (living people)